The 2008 season of Veikkausliiga was the 78th season of top-tier football in Finland. It started on 27 April 2008 and ended on 26 October 2008. The defending champions were Tampere United.

Promotion and relegation
AC Oulu finished at the bottom of the 2007 season and therefore were relegated to Ykkönen. Their place was taken by Ykkönen champions KuPS. 13th placed Veikkausliiga team FC Viikingit and Ykkönen runners-up RoPS competed in a two-legged relegation play-offs for one spot in 2008 Veikkausliiga. RoPS won 2–1 on aggregate and therefore were promoted to Veikkausliiga.

Overview

League table

Relegation play-offs
KuPS and Ykkönen runners-up FC Viikingit competed in a two-legged play-offs for one spot in Veikkausliiga 2009. KuPS won 2–1 on aggregate and thereby retained their league spot for 2009.

Results

Top goalscorers
Source: veikkausliiga.com

Annual awards
Source: Veikkausliigan parhaat kaudella 2008 nimetty

Players' Association's awards
Player of the Year: Dominic Chatto (Inter Turku)
Young player of the Year: Aleksandr Kokko (Honka)
Referee of the Year: Tero Nieminen

Veikkausliiga's awards
Goalkeeper of the Year: Patrick Bantamoi (Inter Turku)
Defender of the Year: Jos Hooiveld (Inter Turku)
Midfielder of the Year: Mika Ojala (Inter Turku)
Attacker of the Year: Aleksandr Kokko (Honka)

External links
 Official website 
 soccerassociation.com

Veikkausliiga seasons
Fin
Fin
1